Youngs River Falls is a  tall waterfall on the Youngs River in central Clatsop County, northwestern Oregon, United States.

History
The first Americans to report on the falls were members of a hunting party from the Lewis and Clark Expedition, in March 1806.

In the media 
The falls have appeared in movies such as Free Willy 2: The Adventure Home, Benji the Hunted and Teenage Mutant Ninja Turtles III.

In July 2014, Tod Gary Wagoner, of Williamsburg, Colorado, died after jumping from the falls, the "first [such] fatality at the falls in a while."  In April 2016, Joseph T. Nestor, a 34-year-old Astoria man, fell and died from injuries at the falls.

References

External links

Youngs River Falls from WaterfallsNorthwest.com

Waterfalls of Oregon
Landforms of Clatsop County, Oregon